Chaneil Kular (born 20 August 1999) is a British actor. After making his debut as Tariq Amiri on the BBC soap opera Doctors in 2018, he began portraying the role of Anwar Bakshi in the Netflix comedy-drama series Sex Education in 2019.

Life and career
Kular was born on 20 August 1999 in Birmingham, West Midlands, where he attended King Edward's School. He is of Indian descent. Kular studied theatre and film at Bristol University before making his acting debut in 2018 when he joined the cast of the BBC soap opera Doctors as Tariq Amiri, who was introduced as a love interest for established character Alia Hanif (Lisa Ambalavanar). The character appeared in  the show on a recurring basis, between June and September 2018, before leaving following the end of his relationship with Alia. Kular then went on to appear in an episode of the BBC One drama series Informer as a pizza delivery boy. Since 2019, he has starred in the Netflix comedy-drama Sex Education as Anwar Bakshi, a gay student of Indian heritage who is a member of "the Untouchables" clique. In 2020, he appeared in the BBC One drama series Black Narcissus as Dilip Rai. In 2022, Kular portrayed Cammy in an episode of the American FX comedy-drama series Atlanta. Kular is also set to star as Harri Bavshar in the upcoming thriller film Accused, directed by filmmaker Philip Barantini.

Filmography

References

External links 
 
 Chaneil Kular at Independent Talent Group

Living people
1999 births
21st-century English male actors
English male television actors
English male film actors
English people of Indian descent
British male actors of Indian descent
Male actors from Birmingham, West Midlands
People educated at King Edward's School, Birmingham